Greda Breška is a settlement in the Ivanić-Grad town of Zagreb County, Croatia. As of 2011 it had a population of 156 people.

References

Populated places in Zagreb County